is a town in Yamagata Prefecture, Japan. ,  the town has an estimated population of 8,441 in 2,848 households, and a population density of 26 persons per km2.

Geography
Mogami is located in the mountains of extreme northeastern Yamagata Prefecture. Despite its name, the Mogami River does not run through the town. The area is known for extremely heavy snows in winter.

Neighboring municipalities
Yamagata Prefecture
Shinjō
Obanazawa
Funagata
Akita Prefecture
Yuzawa
Miyagi Prefecture
Ōsaki
Kami

Climate
Mogami has a humid continental climate (Köppen climate classification Cfa) with large seasonal temperature differences, with warm to hot (and often humid) summers and cold (sometimes severely cold) winters. Precipitation is significant throughout the year, but is heaviest from August to October.

Demographics
Per Japanese census data, the population of Mogami peaked in the 1950s has declined by more half since then. The town is now less populous than it was a century ago.

History
During the Sengoku period, the area was under the control of the Mogami clan who built Oguni Castle. During the Edo period, parts of the area came under the control of Shinjō Domain.  After the start of the Meiji period, the area became part of Mogami District, Yamagata Prefecture. The villages of Higashi-Oguni and Nishi-Oguni were established on April 1, 1889 with the creation of the modern municipalities system. These villages merged to form the town of Mogami on September 1, 1954.

Economy
Mogami was formerly known as a horse breeding area, and numerous ranches supplied horses to the Imperial Japanese Army's cavalry regiments. Modern Mogami is dependent on agriculture, forestry and seasonal tourism to its many hot spring resorts.

Education
Mogami has two public elementary schools and one public middle school operated by the city government and one public high school operated by the Yamagata Prefectural Board of Education.

Transportation

Railways
 East Japan Railway Company -  Rikuu East Line
  -  -  -  -  -  -

Highways

References

External links

Official Website  

 
Towns in Yamagata Prefecture